The 1960 Wichita Shockers football team was an American football team that represented the University of Wichita (now known as Wichita State University) as a member of the Missouri Valley Conference during the 1960 NCAA University Division football season. In its first season under head coach Hank Foldberg, the team compiled an 8–2 record (3–0 against MVC opponents), won the MVC championship, and outscored opponents by a total of 211 to 145. The team played its home games at Veterans Field, now known as Cessna Stadium. Pro Football Hall of Fame coach Bill Parcells was a freshman linebacker on the team.

Schedule

References

Wichita
Wichita State Shockers football seasons
Missouri Valley Conference football champion seasons
Wichita Shockers football